Laal Moroger Jhuti is a 2021 Bangladeshi War-drama film was written and directed by Nurul Alam Atique. It was produced by Matia Banu Shuku. The film stars Ashna Habib Bhabna,Shahjahan Shamrat, Jyotika Jyoti, Deepak Suman, Ahmed Rubel, Ashish Khandaker, Laila Hasan and Zinat Sanu Swagata.

The film is set begun in August 1971 during Bangladesh Liberation War. It was released on 10 December to mark the 50th anniversary of independence of Bangladesh. On 9 December a special screening was held at the Bangladesh Film Archive Auditorium, presided by the Minister for Liberation War Affairs, Mozammel Haque.

Plot
The film depicts the tale of people who desire for independence from the Pakistani occupying forces. In 1971, Bangladesh is a prison. A troupe of the Pakistani occupation forces arrives in a small sub-divisional town to renovate an airbase built during the World War II. In the presence of the army, the relation of the three friends changes. Two of them work for the country's War of Independence while the other collaborates with the Pakistani occupying forces. Overcoming the endless story of actions and reactions, the 'Call of the Red Rooster' brings the message of a new sunrise for the persecuted and oppressed people longing for independence.

Cast
 Ahmed Rubel as Shaheb Ali
 Ashna Habib Bhabna as Poddo
 Dilruba Doel as Reba, Shaheb Ali's daughter
 Shahjahan Shamrat as Captain Naqvi
 Ashok Byapari as Dharanimohon
 Shilpi Sharkar Apu as Mayarani
 Joyraj as Shamsuddin Khan
 Jyotika Jyoti as Dipali
 Ashish Khandaker as Budha
 Ananta Munir Ahmed as Golap
 Dipak Sumon as Parimal
 Zinat Sanu Swagata
 Elora Gohor
 Laila Hasan
 Khalilur Rahman Kaderi
 Refat Hasan Saikat as Subol
 Jubayer Sayed as Captain Munawar
 Matiul Alam as Hamdu Mia
 Hasimun
 Bagha as Bagha, the red roster

Pre-production
In the fiscal year  2014-15 the screenplay received National Film Grant from the Bangladesh Government.

Production
The shooting was started in March 2016, and held due to budget issues. The film is set primarily in three locations- Kushtia, Tangail and Gouripur. It spent six years in production.

References

External links
 
 

2021 drama films
2020s Bengali-language films
2021 war drama films
Bengali-language Bangladeshi films
Bangladeshi war drama films
Films set in the 1970s
Films set in 1971
Films based on the Bangladesh Liberation War
Films directed by Nurul Alam Atique
Government of Bangladesh grants films
Best Film National Film Award (Bangladesh) winners